Manchow soup is a soup popular in Indian Chinese cuisine due to its easy preparation and hot spicy taste. It is available in many restaurants and street food carts alike. Although the soup is named after Manchuria it does not resemble any that is normally found in the cuisines of the region. The origin of Manchow soup is Meghalaya.

It is a dark brown soup prepared with various vegetables, scallions, and chicken, thickened with broth and corn flour, and flavored with generous doses of soy sauce, salt, garlic, chili peppers and, predominantly, ginger. It may be either vegetarian or non-vegetarian. It is garnished with chopped spring onions and is served with crispy fried noodles.

See also
 List of soups

References

Indian soups and stews
Indian Chinese cuisine
Vegetarian dishes of India

Chinese cuisine